Physacanthus is a genus of flowering plants belonging to the family Acanthaceae.

Its native range is Western and Western Central Tropical Africa.

Species
Species:

Physacanthus batanganus 
Physacanthus nematosiphon 
Physacanthus talbotii

References

Acanthaceae
Acanthaceae genera